Perla Marcial Bautista (born February 18, 1940) is a multi-awarded actress in the Philippines. She acted in more than 250 movies and television shows. She won the Best Actress FAMAS Award for Markang Rehas (1962). She also won Gawad Urian Award for Best Supporting Actress in Anak Ng Cabron (1988).

Career
Bautista, at the age of 17 when she joined LVN Pictures together with teenage stars like Bernard Bonnin, Luz Valdez, Marita Zobel and Hector Reyes among others. She was formally introduced in the movie Eddie, Junior Detective (1958). She appeared such films like Malvarosa (1958), Casa Grande (1958), Venganza (1958), Black Beauty (1960) with Charito Solis, and Kilabot sa Barilan (1960) starring Fernando Poe Jr.
 
The first independent outfit Tagalog Ilang Ilang Productions under the late Atty. Espiridion Laxa built up the unique loveteam of Joseph Estrada-Perla Bautista in their first movie together Markang Rehas (1962), both won the FAMAS best actor and best actress trophies.

Bautista did films like De Colores (1968) starring Joseph Estrada, Amalia Fuentes, and Leopoldo Salcedo, and Crush Ko Si Sir (1971) starring Dante Rivero, Hilda Koronel and Jay Ilagan. She played as the mother of Nora Aunor in a classic film Minsa'y Isang Gamu-gamo (1976).

She starred in the film Grandpa Is Dead (2009) with Elizabeth Oropesa, Roderick Paulate and Manilyn Reynes, directed by Soxy Topacio. Bautista played the title role in the independent film Hermana Fausta (2009). She played the lead role in Ang Maestra, about a retired teacher with Alzheimer's disease and starred in the horror film Huling Habilin, about an old woman's ghost seeking justice.

She was cast in the television series Apoy sa Dagat starring Piolo Pascual, Diether Ocampo, and Angelica Panganiban.

Personal life
She is the fifth of eight children of Vicente Bautista and Carmen Marcial. She finished secondary education at the Torres High School and enrolled in Commerce at the Lyceum of the Philippines. She has one son, Jude.

Awards and nominations

Filmography

Film

1975 Pagsapit ng Dilim
1989 Sa Diyos Lang Ako Susuko as Marina
1990 Ikasa Mo Ipuputok Ko!
1991 Sagad Hanggang Buto sa Idad
1991 Ganti ng Api as Josefa
1992 Kapatid Ko si Hudas as Caring
1993 Ako ang Katarungan: Lt. Napoleon M. Guevarra (I am Justice: Lt. Napoleon M. Guevarra) as Cuching
1993 Adan Ronquillo as Chayong Ronquillo
1994 Relaks Ka Lang, Sagot Kita as Joyce
1994 The Fatima Buen Story as Corazon
1994 Lipa 'Arandia' Massacre: Lord, Deliver Us from Evil as Crispina
1995 Dog Tag: Kamay ng Katarungan as Aling Nena
1995 Father En Son as Judge Consolacion
1997 Flames
2007 Seance
2007 Ouija
2008 Condo
2008 Imoral
2009 When I Met U
2009 Fausta
2009 Ded Na si Lolo
2010 Bigasan
2010 Presa
2011 Becky

Television

References

External links

1940 births
Living people
20th-century Filipino actresses
21st-century Filipino actresses
Actresses from Manila
Filipino television personalities
Filipino women comedians
Lyceum of the Philippines University alumni